Samuel Travers Clover (August 13, 1859 – May 28, 1934), commonly known as Sam. T. Clover, was an author, editor and publisher in Chicago and Los Angeles in the late 19th and early 20th centuries).

Biography
Born in Bromley, Middlesex County, southeast of London, to John James Clover (a baker) and Esther Greayer, on August 13, 1859, Clover immigrated to the United States at the age of 10 with his parents.

Clover began his journalistic career at the age of 18 on a paper published by the Chicago Board of Trade. Offered a job on the Chicago Times if he acquired some life experience, he set off on a round-the-world journey, which he documented in two books, the ostensibly factual Leaves from a Diary (1884) and the semi-fictional Paul Travers' Adventures (1897). In Chicago, Clover worked for the Times and other papers, and spent five years in the Dakota Territory. In 1884 he married journalist Mabel Hitt. From 1889 to 1893, served as a correspondent for the Chicago Herald. From 1894 to 1900 he was managing editor of the Chicago Evening Post.

In 1900 Clover and family moved to Los Angeles, where he worked briefly for the Los Angeles Times before taking over editorship of the rival Los Angeles Evening Express. In 1905 he established his own paper, the short-lived Los Angeles Evening News. Clover then took over the Los Angeles Graphic, which he edited from 1908 to 1916. He also bought the Pasadena Daily News in 1912, but was unable to make it successful. Selling the Graphic in 1916, he moved to Richmond, Virginia to take over the Richmond Evening Journal, which he ran until its demise in 1920, after which he returned to Los Angeles.

Clover collected the writings of his son, Greayer Clover, a First World War aviator who died in France, publishing them as A Stop at Suzanne's: and Lower Flights in 1920. That year he also took over editorship of Los Angeles Saturday Night. In 1924 he took over the long-running weekly magazine, The Argonaut. 

In later years, Clover published several books, including The Mounted Muse and other Cadences (a volume of verse), A Pioneer Heritage  (on George Allan Hancock), and King Hal's Fifth Wife (a historical fiction based on the life of Katharine Howard).

Sam Clover died at his desk on May 28, 1934, two months after the death of his wife, known as Madge.

Books

 Leaves from a Diary. Chicago, M.D. Kimball, 1884.
 Paul Travers' Adventures, 1897
 On Special Assignment, 1903. ["Being the Further Adventures of Paul Travers; Showing How He Succeeded as a Newspaper Reporter"]
 Greayson Clover, A Stop at Suzanne's: and Lower Flights, 1920.
 The Mounted Muse and other Cadences, 1928
 A Pioneer Heritage. Saturday Night Publishing Company, 1932. 
 King Hal's Fifth Wife, 1933.

References

External links
 Paul R. Spitzzeri, "Read All About It with Sam T. Clover and Los Angeles Saturday Night, 4 May 1929," The Homestead Blog, 8 May 2019, accessed 2 July 2022.

1859 births
1934 deaths
American newspaper publishers (people)
Writers from Los Angeles
Journalists from California
American male non-fiction writers
Historians from California
19th-century American newspaper publishers (people)
20th-century American newspaper founders
20th-century American newspaper publishers (people)
American magazine founders
American magazine publishers (people)